The following are active airports serving the Melbourne area.

Main airports
The following are the four airports that offer regularly scheduled passenger flights.

 Melbourne Airport  is located in Tullamarine to the north-west of the city. It is Melbourne's Major International Airport. It is by far the busiest airport serving the city with domestic flights to every state and territory of Australia, as well as Africa, Europe, Asia, Oceania, North America and South America. The airport is a major hub for both Qantas and Virgin Australia, and home base for Jetstar and cargo airlines Australian airExpress and Toll Group.
 Avalon Airport  is located to the south-west, outside the city of Geelong, and is the next most prominent airport with Jetstar and soon to be Bonza serving the airport.
 Essendon Airport  is located in the middle north-west of the city and was formerly the primary airport for Melbourne. It is now limited to a handful of passenger airlines and is primarily used for general aviation and cargo flights.
 Moorabbin Airport  is located in the middle southern suburbs and offers a limited number of passenger flights but is the primary general aviation airport in the city.

Other airports
 Coldstream Airport  located in Melbourne's scenic Yarra Valley. The airport is a part of Coldstream and was established in 1962 on the Doake Family property and is a centre for pilot and aviation engineering training and aviation social activities.  It provides charter and scenic flights throughout the state and is a base for aerial fire-fighting services.
 Lilydale Airport  is located in the Yarra Valley near Yarra Glen. In operation since 1968, Lilydale caters for a large number of pilot training flights, 'joyflights', and passenger flights to various parts of the Alpine region.
 RAAF Point Cook  is located at Point Cook, (formerly known as RAAF Williams) and is the spiritual home of the Royal Australian Air Force. It serves as the oldest continuously operating military airfield in the world, and is currently utilised by Training schools, clubs and the RAAF Museum.

List

See also

List of airports in Victoria

References

External links
 Melbourne Airport
 Avalon Airport
 Essendon Airport
 Moorabbin Airport
 Coldstream Airport
 Lilydale Airport
 Melbourne Airport Parking

Airports
Melbourne
Melbourne
Airports
Airports, Melbourne
Melbourne